North La Junta is a census-designated place (CDP) in and governed by Otero County, Colorado, United States. The population of the North La Junta CDP was 482 at the United States Census 2020. The La Junta post office  serves the area.

History
The North La Junta School is listed on the National Register of Historic Places.

Geography
North La Junta is located just across the Arkansas River from the larger City of La Junta.

Demographics

See also

 List of census-designated places in Colorado

References

External links

 La Junta @ Colorado.com
 La Junta @ UncoverColorado.com
 La Junta Tourism
 La Junta Rural Fire Protection District
 Otero County website

Census-designated places in Otero County, Colorado
Census-designated places in Colorado